Carra is one of the nine baronies of County Mayo in Ireland, located in the mid-south area of the county.  It is sometimes known as Burriscarra.  It incorporates the town of Castlebar, the villages of  Tourmakeady, Belcarra and Turlough, where the National Museum of Country Life is situated.

Cara covers an area from approximately Pontoon and Beltra Lough at its northern end to Partry (Ballyovey)  near Ballinrobe and Tourmakeady at its southern end.

History
The ancient barony name is Conmhaícne Cúile Ceara. Clans in the barony include the Partraige and Conmaicne. O'Culachain (O'Colahan) was a sept of the Ui Fiachrach Muaidne (the Fir Ceara) and O'Gormog who once served as chiefs of the Ui Fiachrach. The Murrays, Ó Móráin, O'Learghusa and O'Tierney families were family clans of the barony of Carra.

Carra can also refer to a small village located approximately two miles from Bonniconlon and eight miles from Ballina part of the Bonniconlon parish in the Achonry Diocese in the barony of Gallen, County Mayo, near the Mayo/Sligo border.  At the heart of the community is the local  Carra National School. This is a three teacher school with an enrollment of approximately 43 pupils.

Places of interest

Moore Hall

Moore Hall, the home place of George Henry Moore and his family from 1795 until 1923 is situated in this Barony. There were many prominent Moores born in Moore Hall including Maurice George Moore and George Moore (novelist).  The house, situated above the shores of Lough Carra was burnt in the troubles of 1923 by the IRA.
The house is not open to the public never having been refurbished since it was destroyed but the estate, owned by Coillte now, is a very pleasant place for walkers, overlooking Lough Carra.

National Museum of Country Life

This Museum of Country Life is one of the National Museums of Ireland and situated just off the main road to Castlebar from the east.

Annalistic references

 AI1032.8 Ua Fogartaig, king of the men of Cera, died.

References

External links
oreillydesign.com - Moore Hall 
 Landed Estates Database 

Baronies of County Mayo
Cultural heritage of Ireland